Aquilegia is the plant genus containing the columbines.

Aquilegia may also refer to:

 1063 Aquilegia, a main belt asteroid
 Aquilegia, Italy